The Frafjord Tunnel is a road tunnel in Gjesdal municipality in Rogaland county, Norway. The tunnel opened on 10 June 1999 to replace the old, narrow, winding road that crosses the mountain pass above it, making the trip a faster and safer one.

References

Gjesdal
Road tunnels in Rogaland
Tunnels completed in 1999
1999 establishments in Norway